The European Parliament election of 2014 took place in Italy on 25 May 2014.

The Democratic Party (PD) was by far the most voted list in Trentino (42.4%), while the South Tyrolean People's Party (SVP) was by far the largest party in South Tyrol (48.0%). SVP's Herbert Dorfmann, outgoing MEP, was largely the most voted candidate in the region (86,879 preference votes) as well as in both provinces (16,588 in Trentino and 70,291 in South Tyrol). In the preferences' regional tally Dorfmann was followed by Alessandra Moretti (PD, 17,746) and Oktavia Brugger (Greens–The Other Europe, 17,270). Dorfmann was the only candidate from the region to be elected (in his case, re-elected) to the European Parliament.

Results
Trentino

South Tyrol

References

Elections in Trentino-Alto Adige/Südtirol
European Parliament elections in Italy
2014 European Parliament election
2014 elections in Italy